The Samsung Z4 smartphone is a Samsung product released in June 2017.

Specifications 
 4.50 inch display with 480 x 800 pixels
 1.5 GHz quad-core processor
 1 GB RAM
 8 GB storage (can be expanded up to an additional 128GB via microSD card)
 5 megapixel rear camera
 5 megapixel front camera
 2050 mAh battery
 132.90 mm x 69.20 mm x 10.30 mm (height x width x thickness)
 143.00 grams weight
 Dual SIM 
 Tizen 3.0 OS

See also 
 Samsung
 Android

References

External links 
 

Tizen-based devices
Samsung mobile phones
2017 introductions
Discontinued smartphones